Klaas de Boer (born 6 January 1942, Kollum) is a retired U.S. soccer player and coach.  He played professionally in the American Soccer League and was the 1977 NSCAA Coach of the Year and 1985 American Indoor Soccer Association Coach of the Year.  He coached his teams to two league titles, the 1985 and 1986 AISA championships.

Player
The son of Elisabeth Schaap and Lammert de Boer, a baker in Kollum, Friesland, De Boer immigrated with his family to the United States in 1956. De Boer attended Holland Christian High School in Holland, Michigan before entering Michigan State University.  He played soccer in both high school and college.  In 1973, he signed with the Cleveland Stars in the American Soccer League.  At the end of the season, the Stars came under new ownership who changed the team name to the Cleveland Cobras.  He played one more season in Cleveland.

Coach
Even while playing professionally, De Boer was coaching at the collegiate level.  He was hired by Cleveland State University in 1972 as head soccer coach.  Over six season, he compiled a 55–25–3 record and was named the 1977 NSCAA Coach of the Year.  He then served as an assistant coach with the Los Angeles Aztecs and Detroit Express of the North American Soccer League.  In 1979, he was hired as an assistant coach by the expansion Detroit Lightning of the Major Indoor Soccer League.  In 1984, he became a head coach with the Canton Invaders of the newly established American Indoor Soccer Association.  He took the Invaders to the league championship, winning Coach of the Year honors.  In his two season in Canton, he compiled a 50–32–18 (.640) record and won two championships.  His win percentage is the highest in U.S. indoor soccer history.  Today he runs the Dutch Masters Soccer School in his hometown of Holland, Michigan

References

1942 births
Living people
American Indoor Soccer Association coaches
American soccer coaches
American soccer players
American Soccer League (1933–1983) players
Cleveland Cobras players
Cleveland State Vikings men's soccer coaches
Cleveland State Vikings men's soccer players
Boer, Klaas de
Major Indoor Soccer League (1978–1992) coaches
North American Soccer League (1968–1984) coaches
Boer, Klaas de
People from Holland, Michigan
Boer, Klaas de
Boer, Klaas de
Association footballers not categorized by position
Footballers from Friesland